Lee Pey Woan PPA PK is a Singaporean legal academic who is dean at the Singapore Management University School of Law.

Education 

Lee graduated from King's College London and subsequently obtained her Masters' Degree from Oxford University.

Career 
Lee started work as a Legal Manager at Keppel Corporation.

Academic career 
Lee joined the faculty at the Singapore Management University School of Law in 2000, which was at that point of time still a law department under the Lee Kong Chian School of Business. She was subsequently appointed an associate professor of law in 2008, and a professor of law in 2019. She was also associate dean (undergraduate teaching & curriculum) from 2017 to 2020.

Lee was previously the vice-provost of faculty matters, and is presenly Dean and professor at the Singapore Management University School of Law, serving a 5-year term as the dean of the school with effect from July 2022. She was selected as dean following "an extensive and rigorous global search that started in August 2021". Lee has stated that her aim is to have the school be amongst the top 50 law schools in the world and top 5 in Asia by the end of her term.

Recognition 

Lee is an accomplished scholar whose research interests involve company, private and commercial law. Her work has been cited extensively by various courts.

Lee was also appointed amicus curiae in 2017 by a 5-member coram of the Court of Appeal in the case of PH Hydraulics & Engineering v Airtrust (Hong Kong) Ltd [2017] 2 SLR 129;[2017] SGCA 26, in which the Court, in its Grounds of Decision, expressed "deep appreciation to Prof Lee for her outstanding scholarship as well as cogent oral submissions that aided [it] greatly in arriving at its decision on a particularly thorny area of the common law of contract."

Awards 

Lee has received the Public Administration Medal (Silver) in 2021 and the Commendation Medal in 2010.

References 

Year of birth missing (living people)
Living people
Singaporean academics
Alumni of King's College London
Alumni of the University of Oxford
Recipients of the Pingat Pentadbiran Awam